Duminda Wickramasinghe (born 1 October 1968) is a Sri Lankan former cricketer. He played in 131 first-class and 32 List A matches between 1990/91 and 2006/07. He made his Twenty20 debut on 17 August 2004, for Galle Cricket Club in the 2004 SLC Twenty20 Tournament.

References

External links
 

1968 births
Living people
Sri Lankan cricketers
Galle Cricket Club cricketers
Place of birth missing (living people)